1. FC Bocholt is a German association football club based in Bocholt, North Rhine-Westphalia.

History
The team was founded 21 August 1900 as Fußball-Club Bocholt and in 1919 was joined by VfvB Bocholt, which had been established in 1917 as Ballverein Bocholt. In 1937, they merged with another local side, Ballspielverein 1919 Bocholt, which had played as the football department of Turnverein Phönix Bocholt until 1936. The new club played as BV 1900 Bocholt until after World War II and adopted its current name in 1946.

1. FC enjoyed its greatest successes through the late 1970s and early 1980s playing third-division football. They earned short-lived single-season promotions to the 2. Bundesliga in 1977–78 and 1980–81. The club also made several appearances in DFB-Pokal (German Cup) play in that period and in 1984 advanced as far as the quarter-finals before going out 2–1 to FC Bayern Munich.

After slipping out of the Regionaliga West/Südwest (III) in 1997, Bocholt played for a decade in the Oberliga Nordrhein (IV) as a mid-to-lower table side. The club had a poor 2006–07 campaign and was relegated to the Verbandsliga Niederrhein (V) play. The club dropped as far as the Landesliga Niederrhein, but a division title there in 2014 took it back up to what is now the Oberliga Niederrhein.

Honours
The club's honours:
 Amateurliga Niederrhein (III)
 Champions: 1976
 Amateuroberliga Nordrhein (III)
 Champions: 1980, 1984
 Oberliga Niederrhein (V)
 Champions: 2022
 Lower Rhine Cup
 Winners: 1983

References

External links
 Official website 
 The Abseits Guide to German Soccer

1. FC Bocholt
Association football clubs established in 1900
Football clubs in North Rhine-Westphalia
1900 establishments in Germany
Bocholt, Germany
2. Bundesliga clubs